Elizabeth is a New Jersey Transit station in Midtown in Elizabeth, Union County, New Jersey,  southwest of New York Penn Station on the Northeast Corridor. It is between Broad Street and West Grand Street on an embankment and viaduct. This station is often called Broad Street Elizabeth to distinguish it from North Elizabeth station. A number of bus lines have stops nearby.

History 
On June 9, 1968 the funeral train of Robert F. Kennedy heading south to Washington, DC passed through the station, where crowds lined the tracks to bid farewell and pay tribute. Prior to its passing, two persons were killed and 5 injured after being struck by a northbound Penn Central train that had originated in Chicago. They were unable to get off the track in time, though the New York-bound train's engineer had slowed to 30 mph for the normally 55 mph curve, blown his horn continuously, and rung his bell through the curve.

In January 2015 it was announced that a new station house, platforms, and stairways would be built, a project estimated to cost $55 million (2015 USD). The design was made in coordination with Amtrak (which owns the NEC but ended Elizabeth stops about 1973) which plans to add a fifth track.
The station is next to the former Central Railroad of New Jersey station. Funding was approved in 2018, and includes the creation of a transit plaza between the two stations. Construction began in 2019 and is expected to be completed in 2022.

Station layout
The station has two high-level side platforms; Amtrak's Northeast Corridor trains do not stop.

S-Curve Improvements
The Elizabeth S-curve limits speeds imposed by the transition between the two curves in the S-curve. There have been many discussions over possible improvements. Amtrak says the current speed limit is 80 MPH for Acela and 70 MPH for Northeast Regionals. However, in practice trains operate more slowly “due to a restrictive ‘approach limited’ signaling that governs the approach to Elizabeth, requiring trains to make a braking application.”. In technical terms, the issue is due to restrictive ‘approach limited’ signaling (causing all trains to slow down to 55MPH before speeding back up to the speed limit) and the station needs to be converted to 562 signaling and specified through ACSES transponders to allow travel at the stated speed limit.

If rebuilt, with the track provided with aggressive banking and using modern rolling stock, the speed limit could be raised to 135mph, pushing the northern end of the high speed section in New Jersey closer to Newark. This is included in the improvements Amtrak has planned for the NEC.

See also
List of New Jersey Transit stations
Mid-Town Historic District

References

External links

 Broad Street entrance from Google Maps Street View
 Grand Street entrance from Google Maps Street View
HAER

NJ Transit Rail Operations stations
Former Pennsylvania Railroad stations
Railway stations in Union County, New Jersey
Transportation in Elizabeth, New Jersey
Stations on the Northeast Corridor
Buildings and structures in Elizabeth, New Jersey
1835 establishments in New Jersey
Former Amtrak stations in New Jersey
Railway stations in the United States opened in 1835